Rabodo (or Rapoto) was the imperial vicar and marquis of Tuscany from 1116 until his death in battle in 1119.

A German count, Rabodo was appointed by the Emperor Henry V after the death of the Marchioness Matilda of Tuscany (1115) in order to break the practice of hereditary succession in the Tuscan marquisate. He was a much weaker ruler than his predecessor, unable to dominate the many disparate forces opposed to direct imperial (or German) rule. This weakness is often associated with the rise of autonomous city government in Florence. In a document of 11 September 1116, Rabodo is called "marquis of Tuscany owing to imperial largesse", but in one dated to 1119 he is said to rule "by God's grace", using the same formula used by Matilda.

He moved the Tuscan capital from Florence, where it had been since 1057, to the fortified town of San Miniato al Tedesco, thereafter the seat of the imperial vicars into the 13th century. He brought with him a German entourage, referenced with contempt in many contemporary documents merely as the Teutonici (Germans). In 1116 Rabodo pledged the castle of Bientina to Archbishop Pietro Moriconi of Pisa and the Pisan judge (iudex) and operator (operarius) Ildebrando. This pledge was witnessed by four consuls of the commune of the city of Pisa. Rabodo disputed the jurisdictional claims of the commune of Florence and established an alliance with the city's rivals, the Alberti counts. He took the castle of Monte Cascioli, which was coveted by the Alberti, from the Florentines in 1119. The Florentines assaulted the castle twice, and Rabodo was killed defending it. The castle was burnt to the ground. His successor, Conrad of Scheyern, another German, was in office by 1120.

Notes

References

Margraves of Tuscany
1119 deaths